Dorothy Walker Bush Koch (born August 18, 1959) is an American author and philanthropist. She is the sixth and youngest child of the late 41st president of the United States, George H. W. Bush, and former First Lady Barbara Bush.

Early life

Dorothy Walker Bush was born on August 18, 1959, in Harris County, Texas. Her father, George H. W. Bush, was the 41st President of the United States, and her mother, Barbara Bush, was the First Lady. She was named after her paternal grandmother, Dorothy Walker Bush. Her brother, George W. Bush, was the 43rd President of the United States. Her other four siblings are Pauline Robinson "Robin" Bush, who died of leukemia in 1953; former Florida governor Jeb Bush; Neil Bush; and Marvin Bush. Since she was a child, she has spent summers and holidays at the Bush compound, a seacoast estate in Kennebunkport, Maine.

Bush was educated at Miss Porter's School, a private all-girl college-preparatory school in Farmington, Connecticut.

In 1975, during a visit to Beijing, she became the first person to be publicly baptized in the People's Republic of China since its government began discouraging foreign religious practices in 1949.

She earned a Bachelor of Arts degree in sociology from Boston College in 1982.

Career and volunteer work
Bush is an event organizer and fundraiser for charities and other nonprofit organizations. She co-chairs the Barbara Bush Foundation for Family Literacy along with her brother Jeb. She also served as a pioneer fundraiser for her brother's presidential campaigns.

She is the author of the book My Father, My President: A Personal Account of the Life of George H. W. Bush (2006).

On January 10, 2009, she gave the first orders to the ship's company at Norfolk, Virginia.

Personal life
In 1982, Bush married William Heekin LeBlond (b. January 11, 1957). They had two children, Samuel Bush "Sam" LeBlond (b. 1985) and Nancy Ellis "Ellie" LeBlond (b. 1988). They divorced in 1990.

In June 1992, she married Robert P. "Bobby" Koch (b. 1960), today a Washington, D.C. lobbyist on behalf of the wine industry. The wedding took place at Camp David. They have two children, Robert David (b. 1993) and Georgia Gigi Grace (b. 1996). Robert P. Koch was an aide to House Democratic leader Richard Gephardt, and is president of the California-based Wine Institute. He has a substantial equity interest in Central European Distribution Corp., a company that manufactures and distributes vodka in Poland.

References

External links

1959 births
20th-century American women
21st-century American biographers
American women biographers
21st-century American women writers
American people of Dutch descent
American philanthropists
Morrissey College of Arts & Sciences alumni
Bush family
Children of George H. W. Bush
Children of vice presidents of the United States
Daughters of national leaders
Living people
Livingston family
Miss Porter's School alumni
People from Bethesda, Maryland
People from Cape Elizabeth, Maine
People from Harris County, Texas
Schuyler family
Writers from Maryland
Writers from Texas